James Galanis (born 24 June 1971) is an Australian professional soccer manager. He used to be head coach of the Atlanta Beat in Women's Professional Soccer. He is now Director of the Universal Soccer Academy.

Playing career
Galanis played for South Melbourne FC in Australia's National Soccer League and with Northcote City FC in the Victorian State League.

Managerial career
Galanis assumed the role of head coach for the Atlanta Beat during the 2010 WPS season. He was a trainer and mentor for U.S. national team player, Carli Lloyd, until she cut ties with him in 2020 following a lengthy rift with her family over his involvement in her life.

Galanis now directs the Medford Strikers Soccer Club in New Jersey.

References

External links
 Atlanta Beat coach profile
 Universal Soccer Academy

1970 births
Living people
Women's Professional Soccer coaches
Atlanta Beat (WPS) coaches
Australian soccer coaches
Australian expatriate soccer coaches
Australian expatriate sportspeople in the United States
Expatriate soccer managers in the United States